Sirry Alang is a Cameroonian-American Health Services Researcher. She is an Associate Professor of Sociology and Health, Medicine and Society at Lehigh University. Alang is also a Medical  Sociologist. Her research examines  the structural causes of health inequity and the social determinants of health.

Early life and education 
Alang is from Cameroon. Her mother, Margaret M. Tanni, raised her and encouraged her to pursue an academic career. Alang earned her first degree in Sociology and Anthropology at the University of Buea. She moved to the United States as a graduate student, where she studied sociology at Lehigh University under an F visa. After earning her master's degree, Alang moved to the University of Minnesota, where she studied in the Division of Health Policy and Management and obtained a Ph.D. in Health Services Research, Policy and Administration. Her dissertation about mental health was supervised by Donna McAlpine. It was an ethnography in a predominantly Black neighbourhood where she first witnessed the impact of police violence. While finishing her Ph.D., Alang worked as a Principal Planning Analyst in the Hennepin County Public Health department.

Research and career 
Alang joined the faculty at Lehigh University in 2015, where she investigates structural racism in the healthcare system and how this impacts the delivery and outcome of health services. She is a founding co-director of the Institute of Critical Race and Ethnic Studies at Lehigh University, and the Chair of the Health Justice Collaborative. In 2019 she was named a Campus Compact Engaged Scholar.

Alang worked with Rachel Hardeman to investigate the health impacts of police brutality and how it impacts trust in medical institutions. Together they found that people who had experienced negative encounters with the police had higher levels of mistrust in the medical system. In an interview with Inverse, Alang remarked “When people mistrust the healthcare system, they don’t want to use the healthcare system. They don’t want to engage in care. That’s a big problem, and police brutality increases that,”. Throughout the COVID-19 pandemic Alang investigated the disproportionate impact of coronavirus disease on communities of colour. After the murder of George Floyd, Alang provided expert commentary to the media on the public health impact of police brutality. She wrote about the role of white communities in confronting structural racism, in speaking up, calling out discrimination and taking action to stand up for racial justice. Beyond societal racism, Alang has investigated racism in higher education.

In September 2020, Alang tweeted to call for teachers to become more aware of their language and sensitive to the fact that children could be living in single parent homes, or ones with two mothers or two fathers. The tweet went viral, and was covered across international media.

Select publications

References

External links 

Living people
Year of birth missing (living people)
Cameroonian scientists
Medical sociologists
American people of Cameroonian descent
Lehigh University faculty
University of Buea alumni
University of Minnesota faculty